DJ-Kicks: Kid Loco is a DJ mix album, mixed by Kid Loco. An electronica record, it was released on 18 October 1999 on the Studio !K7 independent record label as part of the DJ-Kicks series.

Track listing
 "Don't You Know I'm Loco" - Kid Loco - 0:43
 "Om Namah Shivaya" - The Bill Wells Octet vs. Future Pilot A.K.A. - 2:55
 "Continuum" - The Cinematic Orchestra - 2:34
 "Dark Light" (Underdog Mix) - Emperors New Clothes - 6:05
 "Mr. Flakey" - The Ted Howler Rhythm Combo - 3:16
 "Theme From Conquest Of The Irrational" (Remix By The Prunes) - DJ Vadim - 3:33
 "Introspection" - Jazzanova - 5:17
 "Dark Soul" - Common Ground - 4:44
 "Blueski" - Underworld - 2:44
 "Grimble" - Grantby - 2:44
 "Jesus Christ Almighty" (Dunderhead and Pylon King Remix) - Deep Season - 3:56
 "Happy Cycling" - Boards of Canada - 5:07
 "One" - Pelding - 2:52
 "Attitude Adjuster" - Tom Tyler - 5:47
 "Culture Consumers" - Tongue - 3:39
 "Lovesick" (Underdog Mix) - Lisa Germano - 3:01
 "Slo Jo" - Stereotyp - 4:28
 "Flyin' On 747" - Kid Loco - 4:59

References

External links 
DJ-Kicks website

Kid Loco
1999 compilation albums